Dolce vita or la dolce vita is Italian for "the sweet life." It may refer to:

Books
"The experience of this sweet life" from Dante Alighieri's Divine Comedy, Canto XX, lines 47–48
The First Intimate Contact (1998), also known as Dolce Vita, novel by Taiwanese author Pi Zicai

Film and TV
La Dolce Vita (1960), film directed by Federico Fellini
Michael Lucas' La Dolce Vita (2006), gay pornographic remake of the 1960 Federico Fellini film
Immigrants (L.A. Dolce Vita) (2008), Hungarian animated film
Dolce Vita (TV programme) (港生活‧港享受) (2000), TV programme in Hong Kong about lifestyles and entertainment
Dolce Vita (1995–1997), a Greek television series starring Anna Panayiotopoulou
Totò, Peppino e... la dolce vita (1961), Italian film parodying Fellini's

Music
La Dolce Vita, soundtrack by Nino Rota of the 1960 Fellini film of the same name
Dolce Vita (2016), album by Jonas Kaufmann
La Dolce Vita – Det Bästa 1982–2003 (2003), compilation album and single by Swedish pop musician Mauro Scocco
Dolce Vita (Okean Elzy album) (2010), album by rock band Okean Elzy
La Dolce Vita (2008), a contemporary jazz album by Warren Hill (musician)
La Dolce Vita, an unreleased debut album by former Murder Inc. Records artist Vita

Songs
"La Dolce Vita" (2004), a song by Zazie from her album Rodéo
"La Dolce Vita" (1979), song by Sparks from their album, No. 1 in Heaven
"Dolce Vita" (song) (1983), song by Ryan Paris
"La dolce vita" (Anneli Saaristosong), 1989, Finnish Eurovision Song Contest entry
"La dolce vita" (After Dark song), 2004
"La Dolce Vita", song from In Between (Paul van Dyk album) (2007)
"Dolce Vita", song by The 69 Eyes (2015)

Enterprises
La Dolce Vita (barge), a hotel barge in Venice
Orient Express La Dolce Vita, a luxury train service around Italy
Dolce Vita (1996), perfume by Christian Dior
Dolce Vita, a 25-floor tower in the Dubai Marina in Dubai
Dolce Vita (Doochy Vachy), a world-famous brothel in Düsseldorf

See also
Dolce (disambiguation)
Dolci (disambiguation), plural of dolce
Dulce (disambiguation)
Dolce far niente
Vita (disambiguation)
 
 
 , which also includes all articles with titles containing "La Dolce Vita"